James Broad may refer to:
James Broad (cricketer) (1814–1888), English cricketer 
James Broad (1958–2001), American heavyweight boxer 
Jimmy Broad (1891–1963), English footballer
James Broad, musician with the band Silver Sun